Bibb County is a county in the central portion of the U.S. state of Alabama.  The county is included in the ARC's definition of Appalachia. As of the 24th decennial 2020 census, its population was 22,293. The county seat is Centreville. The county is named in honor of William W. Bibb (1781–1820), the Governor of Alabama Territory (1817–1819) and the first Governor of Alabama (1819–1820, when he died). He is also the namesake for Bibb County, Georgia, where he began his political career. It is a "prohibition" or dry county; however, a few towns have become "wet" by allowing the sale of alcoholic beverages: Woodstock (December 2017), West Blocton (August 2012), Centreville (June 2010), and Brent (May 2010). The Bibb County Courthouse is located in the county seat of Centreville.

History
Cahawba County was established ("erected") on February 7, 1818, named for the Cahawba River (now more commonly known as Cahaba River). This name came from the Choctaw language word meaning "water above."  On December 4, 1820, it was renamed as Bibb County.

In the wake of the American Civil War, the state legislature passed laws to create a new constitution that raised barriers to voter registration and effectively excluded Freedmen from the political process.  Many residents resisted the objectives of Union occupation both during and after Reconstruction because they wanted to restore the Antebellum social and political norms.  During this time of transition, Bibb, Dallas, and Pickens counties held the third-highest number of lynchings in the state.  On June 18, 1919, Jim McMillan was lynched by a White mob. On November 7, 2000, Bibb County voted against a proposed amendment to Alabama's constitution to abolish the prohibition of interracial marriages.

Geography

Adjacent counties
Jefferson County - north
Shelby County - northeast
Chilton County - southeast
Perry County - southwest
Hale County - southwest
Tuscaloosa County - northwest

National protected areas
 Cahaba River National Wildlife Refuge
 Talladega National Forest (part)

Transportation

Major highways
 U.S. Highway 11
 U.S. Highway 82
 State Route 5
 State Route 25
 State Route 58
 State Route 139
 State Route 209
 State Route 219

Rail
Norfolk Southern Railway

Demographics

2020 census

As of the 2020 United States census, there were 22,293 people, 6,891 households, and 4,789 families residing in the county.

2010 census
As of the census of 2010, there were 22,915 people, 7,953 households, and 5,748 families residing in the county.  The population density was 37 people per square mile (14/km2).  There were 8,981 housing units at an average density of 14.3 per square mile (5.5/km2).  The racial makeup of the county was 75.8% White, 22.0% Black or African American, 0.3% Native American, 0.1% Asian, 0.1% Pacific Islander, 0.8% from other races, and 0.9% from two or more races.  Of the population, 1.8% were Hispanic or Latino of any race.

There were 7,953 households, out of which 29.5% had children under the age of 18 living with them, 52.5% were married couples living together, 14.4% had a female householder with no husband present, and 27.7% were non-families. Of all households, 24.5% were made up of individuals, and 9.40% had someone living alone who was 65 years of age or older.  The average household size was 2.60 and the average family size was 3.09.

In the county, the population was spread out, with 22.7% under the age of 18, 9.0% from 18 to 24, 28.9% from 25 to 44, 26.7% from 45 to 64, and 12.7% who were 65 years of age or older.  The median age was 37.8 years. For every 100 females, there were 115.9 males.  For every 100 females age 18 and over, there were 127.5 males.

The median income for a household in the county was $41,770, and the median income for a family was $51,956. Males had a median income of $40,219 versus $28,085 for females. The per capita income for the county was $19,918.  About 9.4% of families and 12.6% of the population were below the poverty line, including 18.4% of those under age 18 and 11.3% of those age 65 or over.

Rural flight
From 1920 to 1970, the population of the rural county declined considerably. Many African Americans joined the Great Migration to northern and western cities, to escape the violence and racial oppression of Jim Crow.

Education 
Bibb County contains one public school district. There are approximately 3,100 students in public K-12 schools in Bibb County.

The county school district was the plaintiff in Bibb County School District vs. Wickman, a case argued before the Supreme Court of Alabama in 2005. The district's policy permitting student-led prayer before football games hosted at a private venue was ruled not to violate the Establishment Clause of the U.S. Constitution.

Districts 
School districts include:

 Bibb County School District

Government and infrastructure

Bibb County has a five-member County Commission, elected from single-member districts. Members take turns in serving as chairman of the commission, rotating the position every nine and a half months.

Alabama Department of Corrections operates the Bibb Correctional Facility in Brent.

Bibb County is reliably Republican at the presidential level. The last Democrat to win the county in a presidential election was Jimmy Carter, who won it by a majority in 1980 despite narrowly losing the state of Alabama to Ronald Reagan.

Communities

Cities

 Brent
 Centreville (County Seat)

Towns

 Vance (Partly in Tuscaloosa County)
 West Blocton
 Woodstock (Partly in Tuscaloosa County)

Unincorporated communities

Abercrombie
Active
Antioch
Brierfield 
Coleanor
Eoline
Gary Springs
Green Pond
Lawley
Little Hope
Lucille
Marvel
Maud
Piper
Randolph
Sand Mountain
Sixmile

Ghost towns
Cadle

Places of interest
Bibb County is home to the Talladega National Forest supervised by the United States Forestry Service (of the U.S. Department of Agriculture),  and a section of the Cahaba River which draws visitors to view the unique "Cahaba Lily" (known by its scientific Latinized name Hymenocallis coronaria).

See also

 National Register of Historic Places listings in Bibb County, Alabama
 Properties on the Alabama Register of Landmarks and Heritage in Bibb County, Alabama

References

External links
Official County website
Bibb County in the Encyclopedia of Alabama

 

 
1818 establishments in Alabama Territory
Birmingham metropolitan area, Alabama
Counties of Appalachia
Populated places established in 1818